Drone art (also known as drone display or drone light show) is the use of multiple unmanned aerial vehicles (drones), often quadcopters, flying in a coordinated fashion with light fixtures attached. They are usually equipped with multiple LEDs, and the display held at night. The first drone display was presented in 2012 in Linz/Austria, where the Ars Electronica Futurelab introduced SPAXELS (short for "space elements") for the first time. The displays may be for entertainment, where the drones may use flocking or swarming behaviour. The drones may also be coordinated to produce images. Using this emerging technology, displays have been employed for advertising purposes as well.

Intel has produced the Shooting Star, a type of drone used in light shows. They were used during the 2018 Winter Olympics, a Super Bowl halftime show in 2017, and a 2018 4 July celebration.

Drone light shows differ from fireworks displays in that drones are reusable, and do not produce air and noise pollution. However, drone displays cannot take place during rain or strong winds.

List of drone displays
 September 2012 - 49 LED-equipped UAVs, called SPAXELS (short for "Space Elements") shown at world premiere by Ars Electronica Futurelab
 March 2013 - 50 SPAXELS used to perform at the premiere of the film Star Trek Into Darkness next to Tower Bridge in London.
 August 2013 - 30 SPAXELS used to perform the opening of the new campus at QUT, Brisbane / Australia.
 November 2015 - 100 SPAXELS used for the first Guinness World Record "Drone100" by Ars Electronica Futurelab for Intel.
 November 2016 - Five hundred drones were used in Krailling, Germany, a Guinness World Record.
 5 February 2017 - Three hundred drones performed during a Lady Gaga song in the Super Bowl LI halftime show.
 2017 - At the Fortune Global Forum in China, 1,180 drones performed.
 September 2017 - To mark the release of the home version of the Wonder Woman film, 300 drones displayed an enormous "W" in the night sky above Los Angeles.
 December 2017 -  A swarm of 300 drones performed at Art Basel in Miami Beach by Studio Drift and performed by DroneStories.
 2018 - During the 2018 Winter Olympics opening ceremony, 1,218 drones performed, breaking the previous world record.
 June 2018 - One hundred drones performed in Newcastle, England, making shapes to music at the opening of the Great Exhibition of the North.
 July 2018 - Intel celebrates 50th anniversary with 2018 simultaneous drones over facility in Folsom, California, for Guinness world record.  Guinness credited Intel with flying 2066 simultaneous drones.
 January 2019 - Two hundred drones deployed the World's first New Year's Countdown set to fireworks and music for the New Year Celebrations on Al Marjan Island.
 3 February 2019 - 150 enhanced Intel Shooting Star drones, choreographed to the music of Maroon 5 at the superbowl halftime show.  
 July 2019 - Two hundred and fifty drones performed at the opening show of the 24th World Scout Jamboree.
 August 2019 - Five hundred drones performed at the 80 years of VDNH celebration in Moscow
 October 2019 - Two hundred drones presented the new Peugeot 208 above Paris.
 December 10, 2019 - 150 Drones were used to show a spectacular dazzling display for the ending ceremony of South Asian Games 2020, Nepal held at the Dasharath stadium in Kathmandu, Nepal.
 June 2020 - A two hundred drone light show celebrated the 3rd edition of the San Giovanni Festival, breaking world record for simultaneous indoor drone flight.
 September 3, 2020 - Geoscan Group launched 2,198 drones at the 75th anniversary of the end of the World War II in Saint Petersburg, Russia. Record registered by the Record Book of Russia.
 September 20, 2020 - 3,051 drones create a spectacular light show in China and break Guinness World Record. New record set by Shenzhen Damoda Intelligent Control Technology Co., Ltd (China) in Zhuhai, Guangdong. 
 November 7, 2020 - President-elect Joe Biden presidential victory speech featured a celebration drone light and firework show in Wilmington, Delaware.
 November 8, 2020 - 1,000 drones show at the «Wonder of Light» festival in Saint Petersburg (Russia) performed by Geoscan Group.
 December 31, 2020 - 300 drone show at the London’s New Year’s Eve fireworks and lighting display in London (UK) performed by Skymagic.
 March 17, 2021 - 500 Intel drones in a (pre-recorded) Orchestra of Light show to celebrate St. Patrick's Day in Dublin.
 April 12, 2021 – Geoscan Drone Show team launches 500 drones in Velikiy Novgorod (Russia) to celebrate the 60th anniversary of the 1st man’s flight to space.
 May 2, 2021 – a performance of 500 quadcopters was shown at the Tourist Season Opening festival in St. Petersburg (Russia).
 May 9, 2021 – 1000 drones were launched by Geoscan Drone Show team at the Rzhev Memorial to the Soviet Soldier to pay respect to the soldiers fallen in the Battles of Rzhev.
 May 2021 – 580 quadcopters show presentation of the new Hyundai Tucson in Istanbul city. The show was performed by Geoscan Drone Show team.
 July 2021, Show using 5200 drones was completed in China 
 July 23, 2021 - 1,824 drones are used during the Tokyo 2020 Summer Olympics opening ceremony.  The drones start above the stadium in positions that depict the Tokyo 2020 games emblem which slowly changes into a rotating sphere with the countries of the world outlined.
 August 21, 2021 – a drone show of 1200 quadcopter were launched in Nizhniy Novgorod by Geoscan Drone Show to celebrate the city’s 800th anniversary.
 August 25, 2021 – 1000 drones were put into the sky in Ufa by Geoscan Drone Show to perform a display dedicated to the beginning of the WorldSkills Russia contest.
 August 27, 2021 – Samsung Electronics company presented its new smartphones in Estonia with a drone show of 500 quadcopters launched by Geoscan Drone Show team
 August 31, 2021 – 1000 drones launch to celebrate the Knowledge Day in Pushkin, Saint Petersburg.
 September 4, 2021 - A 100-drone show by Cyberdrone to celebrate the 875th anniversary of Yelets.
 September 18, 2021 - Cyberdrone's light show with 100 drones celebrating the Balashikha City Day 
 September 21, 2021 – 1000 drones were used in a drone display performed by Geoscan Drone Show during the Armenia Independence Day celebrations
 October 20, 2021 – 2100 drones were used in a display performed by Geoscan Drone Show during the opening ceremony of Riyadh Seasons 2021
 December 04, 2021 - 300 drones illuminated the sky of Mumbai in Cyberdrone's stunning light show 
 December 11, 2021 - 500 Cyberdrone drones turn the 75 glorious years of Grasim celebration into a unique spectacle 
 January 1, 2022 - Cyberdrone Johnnie Walker light show with 500 drones dancing in the sky  
 January 1, 2022 - London had show (from SkyMagic) as part of their New years day celebration
 January 29, 2022 - 1000 drones performed in a display at the Beating Retreat ceremony in New Delhi as a part of India's Republic Day celebrations.
 February, 2022 - A drone light show team Verge Aero were a contenstants, "golden buzzer" (staight to final award) and finalists in the TV show America's Got Talent: Extreme
 March 1, 2022 - 663 UAVs form the slogan "Русский военный корабль, иди на хуй" ("Russian warship, go fuck yourself") against the background of the Motherland Monument in Kyiv.
 March 6, 2022 - Disneyland Paris started a pre and post Illuminations drone show called D Lite and After Glow for their 30th birthday celebrations due to run nightly until 30th September 2022.
 March 2022 - The world’s first feature-length drone art show, SKY SONG at Adelaide Fringe Festival, performed by Celestial. Involving the world’s biggest holographic projector screens, show lighting and soundtrack. All of it showcasing First Nation art.
 June 25, 2022 - 500 drones flying over the Miloud Hadefi olympic stadium in Oran, throughout the opening ceremony of the Mediterranean Games 2022, Oran / Algeria.
 August 28, August 30 and September 1, 2022 - 400 drones by SkyMagic performed over Weston-super-Mare, UK, as part of the See Monster art installation
 October 2022 - 500 drones, performed by Celestial and commissioned by Prime Video, lit up the skies in Lagos, Nigeria for the season finale of Lord Of The Rings: The Rings of Power. Making this the first drone show ever in West Africa.
 January 1, 2023 - Celestial drones performed at the London New Year Eve's Celebration

Drone Teams 
 
 Go Drone Shows
 DroneStories
 Сyberdrone
 Geoscan Drone Show
 Lumasky Drone Show
 Grizzly Drones | Grizzly Entertainment
 Ars Electronica Futurelab
 Ascending Technologies / Intel 
 Verge Aero
 skymagic
 WG Drones
 Celestial

See also
 Aerial advertising
 Laser lighting display
 Light art
 Swarm robotics

References

Multi-robot systems
Emerging technologies
Light art